Chresten Falck Damborg (born 24 February 1987), known as Chresten, is a Danish singer who won season 6 of the Danish X Factor. He became one of the finalists in the "Over 25" category and was mentored by Ida Corr. Prior to applying to  X Factor, he worked as a toolmaker. On the final, held on 22 March 2013, he won the title with 57.9% of the popular vote with the other finalist Karoline as runner-up with 42.1% of the votes.

After he won, he was signed to Sony Music and his debut single "Let Go" charted in the Danish Singles Chart, reaching number 8. In 2014, he released his debut album Wanderlust on also on Sony Music.

Performances during X Factor

Discography

Albums

Singles

References

The X Factor winners
Living people
1987 births
21st-century Danish  male singers